Tetralophodon ("four-ridged tooth") is an extinct genus of "tetralophodont gomphothere" belonging to the superfamily Elephantoidea, known from the Miocene to Pliocene of Afro-Eurasia.

Taxonomy
The genus Tetralophodon (meaning "four-ridged tooth") was named in the mid-19th century with the discovery of the specialized teeth.

Tetralophodon is suggested by some authors to have descended from Gomphotherium. "Tetralophodont gomphotheres" like Tetralophodon are thought to be more closely related to elephantids and stegodontids than to trilophodont gomphotheres.

Description
 
Tetralophodon was an elephant-like animal which existed through the late Miocene to the Middle Pliocene epochs,

These incisors are believed to have been used as a defense mechanism.

These low-crowned, bunodont teeth were adapted for crushing and grinding, compared with other mammals during this era that had sharp teeth used for cutting. The teeth indicate a diet of large fruits and vegetables. This diet was aided by the large size and long trunks that enabled these mammals to reach tall, fruit-bearing trees.

Some features, mainly concerning the teeth, would seem to place Tetralophodon close to the origin of today's elephants. The molars, in particular, are more advanced and specialized than those of the other gomphotheres.

Distribution
 
These animals were very widespread and successful proboscideans. Their fossils have been found from the late Miocene to the Middle Pliocene epochs of Europe, Asia, and Africa. Most fossil records of Tetralophodon are of four-ridged teeth. The North American species, T. campester and T. fricki, have been moved to the genus Pediolophodon in 2007.

References

Elephantoidea
Prehistoric placental genera
Pliocene proboscideans
Miocene proboscideans
Miocene mammals of Europe
Miocene mammals of Asia
Pliocene mammals of Europe
Pliocene mammals of Asia
Miocene mammals of Africa
Pliocene mammals of Africa
Fossil taxa described in 1847